Moses Tito Kachima is a member of the African Union's Economic, Social and Cultural Council, representing Southern Africa.

References 

Kachima, Moses Tito
Living people
Year of birth missing (living people)